Moses Tanui (born 20 August 1965 in Sugoi Nandi District, Kenya) is a former Kenyan long-distance runner who won the gold medal over 10,000 metres at the 1991 World Championships in Athletics in Tokyo.

Biography
At the 1993 World Championships in Athletics in Stuttgart he finished second after a controversial incident on the final lap in which he lost one shoe after the eventual winner Haile Gebrselassie had stepped repeatedly, lap after lap as a race video reveals, upon Tanui's heels. He also won the 100th Boston Marathon in 1996 as well as the 102nd Boston Marathon in 1998. Tanui won IAAF World Half Marathon Championships in 1995 and silver in the 1997 competition.

He was the first athlete to run a half marathon in less than one hour by running 59:47 in Milan on 3 April 1993. His record was broken five years later by fellow Kenyan Paul Tergat.

At the Chicago Marathon in 1999, Tanui helped spur Khalid Khannouchi to a new world record, eventually finishing 2nd in 2:06:16, which was a Kenyan national record and the third fastest marathon in history at that point.

He was still active in 2004 when he competed at the Seoul International Marathon. He retired later due to a knee injury. Today he operates a training camp in Kaptagat . Tanui has also initiated two of Eldoret's most prominent events, the Discovery Cross Country race, and the Eldoret City Marathon.

He was involved in a serious car accident near Nakuru in February 2010 suffering major injuries to his leg and chest. David Lelei, another former runner, was driving Tanui's car and died in the accident.

Achievements
All results regarding marathon, unless stated otherwise

References

External links

1965 births
Living people
People from Nandi County
Kenyan male long-distance runners
Kenyan male marathon runners
Kenyan athletics coaches
Olympic athletes of Kenya
Athletes (track and field) at the 1988 Summer Olympics
Athletes (track and field) at the 1992 Summer Olympics
World Athletics Championships medalists
World Athletics Championships athletes for Kenya
World Athletics Half Marathon Championships winners
Boston Marathon male winners
Commonwealth Games medallists in athletics
Commonwealth Games silver medallists for Kenya
Kenyan male cross country runners
Athletes (track and field) at the 1990 Commonwealth Games
World Athletics Championships winners
Medallists at the 1990 Commonwealth Games